The 1999 Los Angeles Dodgers season was the 110th for the franchise in Major League Baseball, and their 42nd season in Los Angeles, California. The season started with a new management team; Kevin Malone became the team's General Manager and Davey Johnson was selected to be the new Dodgers Manager. Looking to make a splash, Malone exclaimed "There is a new Sheriff in town" as he took over the reins and made a splash by signing starting pitcher Kevin Brown to a huge long contract. However, the team struggled to a third-place finish in the Western Division of the National League.

Offseason
 October 12, 1998: Acquired Scott Prouty from the Seattle Mariners for Eric Weaver.
 November 11, 1998: Acquired Mel Rojas from the New York Mets for Bobby Bonilla.
 December 1, 1998: Acquired Todd Hundley and Arnold Gooch from the New York Mets for Charles Johnson and Roger Cedeño.
 January 11, 1999: Doug Bochtler was released by the Dodgers.
 January 12, 1999: Acquired Joe Sutton from the Chicago White Sox for Darren Hall.

Regular season

Season standings

Record vs. opponents

Opening Day lineup

Notable transactions

 April 16, 1999: Acquired Robinson Checo, Apostol Garcia and Rick Roberts from the Detroit Tigers for Dave Mlicki and Mel Rojas.
 May 19, 1999: Acquired Doug Bochtler from the Toronto Blue Jays for cash.

Roster

Starting Pitchers stats
Note: G = Games pitched; GS = Games started; IP = Innings pitched; W/L = Wins/Losses; ERA = Earned run average; BB = Walks allowed; SO = Strikeouts; CG = Complete games

Relief Pitchers stats
Note: G = Games pitched; GS = Games started; IP = Innings pitched; W/L = Wins/Losses; ERA = Earned run average; BB = Walks allowed; SO = Strikeouts; SV = Saves

Batting Stats
Note: Pos = Position; G = Games played; AB = At bats; Avg. = Batting average; R = Runs scored; H = Hits; HR = Home runs; RBI = Runs batted in; SB = Stolen bases

1999 Awards
1999 Major League Baseball All-Star Game
 Gary Sheffield reserve
NL Player of the Week
Raúl Mondesí (April 5–11)
Eric Karros (Sep. 20–26)

Farm system

Major League Baseball Draft

The Dodgers selected 50 players in this draft. Of those, seven of them would eventually play Major League baseball. They lost their first round pick to the San Diego Padres and their third round pick to the Baltimore Orioles as a result of their signing free agent pitchers Kevin Brown and Alan Mills. They also gained a supplemental first round pick and a second round pick as compensation for losing pitcher Scott Radinsky to free agency and a supplemental second round pick as compensation for pitcher Brian Bohanon.

The first round pick was shortstop Jason Repko from Hanford High School. He was transitioned to the outfield and played seven seasons in the majors (four with the Dodgers). He had several serious injuries in his career and was relegated primarily to a backup position. Repko hit .224 in 360 MLB games. The draft class also included outfielder Shane Victorino, who was drafted in the sixth round out of St. Anthony High School in Hawaii. He was selected by the Philadelphia Phillies in the 2004 Rule 5 draft and proceeded to become a two-time All-Star and two-time World Series champion.

References

External links 
1999 Los Angeles Dodgers uniform
Los Angeles Dodgers official web site
Baseball-Reference season page
Baseball Almanac season page

Los Angeles Dodgers seasons
Los Angeles Dodgers
1999 in sports in California